Ministry of Parliamentary Affairs may refer to:

Ministry of Parliamentary Affairs (India)
Ministry of Parliamentary Affairs (West Bengal), India
Ministry of Parliamentary Affairs (Pakistan)
Ministry of Parliamentary Affairs (Portugal)
Ministry of Parliamentary Affairs (South Sudan)
Ministry of Parliamentary Affairs (Sri Lanka)